Ectonucleoside triphosphate diphosphohydrolase 4 is a protein that in humans is encoded by the ENTPD4 gene.

Function

This gene encodes a member of the apyrase protein family. Apyrases are enzymes that catalyze the hydrolysis of nucleotide diphosphates and triphosphates in a calcium or magnesium ion-dependent manner. The encoded protein is an endo-apyrase and may play a role in salvaging nucleotides from lysosomes. Alternatively spliced transcript variants encoding multiple isoforms have been observed for this gene, and these isoforms may differ in divalent cation dependence and substrate specificity. [provided by RefSeq, Sep 2011].

References

Further reading